Palau competed at the 2017 World Championships in Athletics in London, Great Britain, from 4–13 August 2017.

Results

Men
Track and road events

References

Nations at the 2017 World Championships in Athletics
World Championships in Athletics
Palau at the World Championships in Athletics